Bimal Rathnayake is a Sri Lankan politician and a member of the Parliament of Sri Lanka. He is a national organiser and political bureau member of the people's liberation front (JVP).

He is a member of the Janatha Vimukthi Peramuna party.

References

Living people
Members of the 12th Parliament of Sri Lanka
Members of the 13th Parliament of Sri Lanka
Members of the 15th Parliament of Sri Lanka
Janatha Vimukthi Peramuna politicians
United People's Freedom Alliance politicians
1973 births